Jaime Vilamajó (born 27 November 1959) is a former Spanish racing cyclist. He rode in twelve Grand Tours between 1981 and 1989.

Major results

1982
1st Stage 4 Tour of the Basque Country
3rd Clasica de Sabiñánigo
8th Overall Vuelta a España
1983
1st Stage 2 Vuelta a los Valles Mineros
8th Overall Setmana Catalana de Ciclisme
1984
2nd Overall Vuelta a Andalucía
10th Overall Setmana Catalana de Ciclisme
1st Stage 1
1986
1st Stage 4 Vuelta a los Valles Mineros 
3rd Overall Vuelta a Murcia
10th Overall Vuelta a Andalucía
1987
1st Stage 22 Vuelta a España
1988
1st Stage 4a Setmana Catalana de Ciclisme

References

External links

1959 births
Living people
Spanish male cyclists
People from Tàrrega
Sportspeople from the Province of Lleida
Cyclists from Catalonia
20th-century Spanish people